Rydbo is a locality situated in Österåker Municipality, Stockholm County, Sweden with 582 inhabitants in 2010. It is situated about 20 km north-east of Stockholm and is served by Roslagsbanan narrow gauge suburban railway. Near Rydbo is Rydboholm Castle.

References 

Populated places in Österåker Municipality